Home First Finance Company India Limited is an Indian housing finance company in the affordable housing segment based in Mumbai and founded in 2010. It provides home loans, loan against property and home construction loans. Its equity shares are listed on Bombay Stock Exchange and National Stock Exchange.

History
Home First Finance was founded in 2010 by former chairman and co-founder of Mphasis, Jerry Rao; former CEO and MD of Bank of Baroda, PS Jayakumar; and Manoj Viswanathan, who previously worked with Citigroup India. It commenced operations in August 2010 after registering with the National Housing Bank, the regulatory and licensing body for housing finance companies in India. In 2011, Bessemer Venture Partners bought a minority stake in the company for an undisclosed sum.

In 2013, Tata Capital Growth Fund picked up a minority stake in the company. Home First Finance turned profitable in 2014.

In February 2017, private equity firm True North acquired a majority stake in Home First Finance for over 600 crore. A co-investor in this round, Aether (Mauritius) Limited, an affiliate of the Singaporean sovereign wealth fund GIC, also became part of the company's promoter group with True North.

In October 2020, Warburg Pincus acquired a 25% stake in Home First Finance for 700 crore. In January 2021, Warburg Pincus increased its stake to 30.62% ahead of Home First Finance's initial public offering.

In January 2021, Home First Finance launched its initial public offering (IPO) of 1,154 crore; the IPO was subscribed over 26 times. Equity shares of the company began trading on Bombay Stock Exchange and  National Stock Exchange on 3 February 2021.

In December 2021, Union Bank of India (UBI) and Home First Finance Company India Ltd (HomeFirst) enter into a strategic co-lending partnership

Operations
Home First Finance primarily functions in the affordable housing segment, providing home loans to low and middle-income individuals. As of June 2022, 90% of its gross loan assets are from home loans, and 9% from the loan against property vertical. The company operates in 13 states and 1 union territory through 93 branches. As of March 2022, 63.3% of its loan assets are from the states of Gujarat, Maharashtra and Tamil Nadu.

References

External links
 

Housing finance companies of India
Financial services companies based in Mumbai
Financial services companies established in 2010
Indian companies established in 2010
2010 establishments in Maharashtra
Companies listed on the National Stock Exchange of India
Companies listed on the Bombay Stock Exchange